Hephzibah is a city in southern Richmond County, in the U.S. state of Georgia. It is part of the Augusta metropolitan area. The population was 4,011 at the 2010 census. Hephzibah is a poetic name used in the Book of Isaiah (62:4) to refer to Jerusalem, meaning "My delight is in Her."

History
Hephzibah was originally named Brothersville, in honor of three brothers who settled near one another.  In October 1860, a Baptist seminary was established in Brothersville by a group of Appling residents. They established the Hephzibah Baptist Church in 1862. The prominence of these new religious institutions in the area swayed the state of Georgia to rename the town Hephzibah in 1870. In 1909, Walter A. Clark published a book of local history, named A Lost Arcadia - The Story of My Old Community, detailing the earliest days of Hephzibah.

In 1996 the governments of the city of Augusta and Richmond County combined to form a consolidated government. The residents of Hephzibah and nearby Blythe voted to maintain their separate city governments prior to this action. Some municipal services in Hephzibah are provided by the consolidated Augusta-Richmond County, while water, fire, and police services are maintained by the city.

After years of slow decline, the retail economy in Hephzibah has increased substantially since 2010. New businesses are an IGA grocery store, CrossFit gym, and a branch of the local chain restaurant Wife Saver, specializing in Southern food. The Wife Saver has since closed, but a new Dollar General was opened on Highway 88.

Geography
Hephzibah is located at  (33.304126, -82.097923).

Highways

Demographics

2020 census

As of the 2020 United States census, there were 3,830 people, 1,424 households, and 1,022 families residing in the city.

2000 census
As of the census of 2000, there were 3,880 people, 1,374 households, and 1,090 families residing in the city. The racial makeup of the city was 71.37% White, 25.08% African American, 0.36% Native American, 0.62% Asian, 0.15% Pacific Islander, 0.75% from other races, and 1.68% from two or more races. Hispanic or Latino of any race were 1.96% of the population.

There were 1,374 households, out of which 39.5% had children under the age of 18 living with them, 57.4% were married couples living together, 17.7% had a female householder with no husband present, and 20.6% were non-families. 17.5% of all households were made up of individuals, and 5.3% had someone living alone who was 65 years of age or older. The average household size was 2.81 and the average family size was 3.14.

In the city, the population was spread out, with 28.2% under the age of 18, 9.2% from 18 to 24, 30.3% from 25 to 44, 23.1% from 45 to 64, and 9.3% who were 65 years of age or older. The median age was 35 years. For every 100 females, there were 93.2 males. For every 100 females age 18 and over, there were 90.9 males.

The median income for a household in the city was $37,123, and the median income for a family was $42,898. Males had a median income of $32,917 versus $22,841 for females. The per capita income for the city was $15,905. About 12.9% of families and 16.3% of the population were below the poverty line, including 19.5% of those under age 18 and 16.8% of those age 65 or over.

Education
Richmond County School System operates public schools, including Hephzibah Elementary School, Hephzibah Middle School, and Hephzibah High School.

There is also a charter school, Georgia School of Innovation and the Classics (GSIC).

Religion
Christianity is predominant in the region, with the largest denominations being Independent Baptist, Southern Baptist and Methodist.

Notable locations
 Augusta International Raceway
 Diamond Lakes Recreation Center
 Jessie Carroll Park and Recreation Center
 Blythe Recreation Center

Notable people
This list includes people who were born in Hephzibah or who spent a significant amount of time living in the town.

Photos

See also

 Hephzibah High School

References

External links
 Behind the Name: Meaning, origin and history of the name Hephzibah

 
Cities in Georgia (U.S. state)
Cities in Richmond County, Georgia
Augusta metropolitan area